Gisèle Lelouis (10 March 1952) is a French politician from National Rally (RN) who has represented the 3rd constituency of Bouches-du-Rhône in the National Assembly since 2022.

See also 

 List of deputies of the 16th National Assembly of France

References 

Living people
1952 births
Deputies of the 16th National Assembly of the French Fifth Republic
National Rally (France) politicians
21st-century French politicians
21st-century French women politicians
Women members of the National Assembly (France)
Members of Parliament for Bouches-du-Rhône